Anthuridae is a family of isopods belonging to the order Isopoda.

Genera

Genera:
 Amakusanthura Nunomura, 1977
 Anthura Leach, 1814
 Apanthura Stebbing, 1900

References

Isopoda
Crustacean families